In 1938, the comic strip The Captain and the Kids (Rudolph Dirks' parallel version of his own strip The Katzenjammer Kids) was adapted by Metro-Goldwyn-Mayer, becoming the studio's first self-produced series of theatrical cartoon short subjects, directed by William Hanna, Bob Allen, and Friz Freleng. The short-lived series was unsuccessful, ending after one year and a total of 15 cartoons. Following that cancellation, Freleng returned to Warner Bros., where he had earlier been an animation director. The Captain was voiced by Billy Bletcher, Mama was voiced by Martha Wentworth, the kids were voiced by Shirley Reid and Jeanne Dunne, and John Silver was voiced by Mel Blanc.

Titles

See also
 Joseph Barbera

Notes

References

External links
 'Cleaning House' (1938) 
 'A Day at the Beach' (1938)
 Turner colorized versions (Archive.org)

Film series introduced in 1938
1930s American animated films
Animated short film series
American black-and-white films
Animated short films based on comics
Film series based on comics
Metro-Goldwyn-Mayer animated short films
Metro-Goldwyn-Mayer cartoon studio film series
The Katzenjammer Kids
Pirate films